Universal basic income in Germany (German: Grundeinkommen) has been discussed since the 1970s, with emphasis placed on its unconditional dimension by 2003. The universal basic income concept has many definitions, such as Philippe Van Parijs', which described it as the income paid by the government, at a uniform level and regular intervals to each adult citizen and permanent residents of the country. The Basic Income Earth Network's criteria constitute one of the most popular proposals and they include: 1) income must be paid to individuals instead of households; 2) income should be paid irrespective of income from other sources; and, 3) it must be paid without requiring performance of any work.

History 

The debate about basic income in West Germany began gathering steam in the 1980s, when groups of unemployed people became interested and took a stance for the reform. When Basic Income European Network was founded (today Basic Income Earth Network) in 1986, there was a German sociologist among the founders, Claus Offe, who since then has been active in the academic debate.

In 2004 the Netzwerk Grundeinkommen is founded. The Hartz-reforms introduced by the Cabinet of Gerhard Shröder in 2003–2005 triggers the basic income debate quite a lot, even though the reforms themselves are widely seen as very anti-basic income. A few years later, 2009, Susanne Wiest, a home wife, made a presentation in the German Parliament about the basic income petition she had initiated and which got support from 52.973 people. The next year there was several basic income-demonstrations, the biggest in Berlin. By 2011, the Pirate Party proposed basic income on the state parliament and after a two-hour-long debate it was decided that they shall work for basic income along with minimum wages. In 2012 there was a meeting between Susanne Wiest and Angela Merkel to discuss basic income. The meeting took place under the democracy project "Dialog über Deutschland". In Germany on Sunday, 25 September, a new political party was founded, Bündnis Grundeinkommen (“Basic Income League”, called “BGE Partei” for short). The league was admitted for state elections for the first time in federal state Saarland in January 2017 and in April 2017 for the state elections in federal state Nordrhein-Westfalen. Bündnis Grundeinkommen was admitted for the German federal election 2017.

Presently, there is a two-tier unemployment compensation system in Germany, which consists of a form of UBI and basic income ALG II with strict behavioral requirements for the unemployed. For instance, active cooperation is a major condition for access. While the system does not satisfy the criteria of  Basic Income Earth Network and other reform proponents, the generosity of basic income transfers in the country is considered high by international standards, especially for claimants who have children.

Proponents 

Well-known parties calling for the introduction of a basic income across Germany are the Pirate Party Germany, Die PARTEI, and the Basic Income Alliance. Some of the most well-known (individual) proponents of basic income in recent decades include the following:

See also
 Mein Grundeinkommen

External links

 Netzwerk Grundeinkommen (German)
 Netzwerk Grundeinkommen (English)

References 

 
Germany
Economy of Germany